Frank Lequin (born 1946) is a Dutch historian, academic, editor and author.   He is best known as an expert on the Dutch East Indies Company and Isaac Titsingh.

Early life
Lequin was born in Rotterdam in 1946.  He was awarded a Ph.D. from the University of Leiden in 1982.

Career
In 1976, he founded the Titsingh Institute for research.

Selected works
  (2013). Varia Titsinghiana. Addenda & corrigenda. Leiden. (Titsingh Studies, vol. 6) 
  (2011) Isaac Titsingh, opperhoofd van Japan. Drie geschriften als filosoof, diplomaat & koopman. Alphen aan den Rijn. (Titsingh Studies, vol. 5) 
  (2009) De particuliere correspondentie van Isaac Titsingh (1783-1812). Alphen aan den Rijn. 2 vols. (Titsingh Studies, vol. 4) 
  (2005) Isaac Titsingh in China (1794-1796). Alphen aan den Rijn. (Titsingh Studies, vol. 3) 
  (2003) À la recherche du Cabinet Titsingh. Its history, contents and dispersal. Catalogue raisonné of the collection of the founder of European Japanology.  Alphen aan den Rijn. (Titsingh Studies, vol. 2) 
  (2002). Isaac Titsingh (1745-1812). Een passie voor Japan, leven en werk van de grondlegger van de Europese Japanologie. Leiden. (Titsingh Studies, vol. 1) 
 (1990–92). The Private Correspondence of Isaac Titsingh. Amsterdam. (Japonica Neerlandica, vol. 4-5). 2 vols.  (volume 1)  (volume 2)
  (1989) Samuel van de Putte, een mandarijn uit Vlissingen (1690-1745). De onbedoelde publicatie van een restant. 
  (1982) Het personeel van de Verenigde Oost-Indische Compagnie in Azie in de achttiende eeuw, meer in het bijzonder in de vestiging Bengalen.

References

See also
 Titsingh Instituut  

1946 births
Living people
Dutch orientalists
Leiden University alumni
Academic staff of Leiden University
Writers from Rotterdam
Historians of the Dutch East India Company